The American Journal of Infection Control is a peer-reviewed scientific journal published by Elsevier on behalf of the Association for Professionals in Infection Control and Epidemiology. The journal publishes articles describing original research on the epidemiology, infection control, and infectious diseases. According to the 2020 Journal Citation Reports, the journal has a 2020 impact factor of 2.95.

The journal was established in 1966 and the editor-in-chief is Patricia Stone (Columbia University).

References

External links
 

Microbiology journals
Elsevier academic journals
Publications established in 1966